Doc Williams may refer to:

Doc Williams (racing driver) (1912–1982), American racecar driver
Doc Williams (singer) (1914–2011), American country music band leader and vocalist
Doc Williams (American football) (1899–1992), American football player